Hypolamprus subrosealis is a moth of the family Thyrididae first described by John Henry Leech in 1889. It is found in Sri Lanka.

References

Moths of Asia
Moths described in 1889
Thyrididae